Osinovetsky Light is an active lighthouse in Lake Ladoga, in Leningrad Oblast, Russia. It is located on a headland near the southwest corner of the lake near Kokorevo. The light marks the west side of the entrance to the southernmost bay of the lake, leading to the Neva entrance.

At a height of  it is the eighth tallest "traditional" lighthouse in the world. It is a slightly shorter twin of Storozhenskiy Light.

The lighthouse has served as an important landmark in the Road of Life during the Siege of Leningrad (September 8, 1941 to January 27, 1944).

The former lightkeeper, Sergey Shulyatev, has had this position from 1987 to 2010, being then the oldest lighthouse keeper in Russia.

See also

 List of lighthouses in Russia
List of tallest lighthouses in the world

Notes

References

Lighthouses completed in 1905
Lighthouses in Russia
Buildings and structures in Leningrad Oblast
Transport in Leningrad Oblast
1905 establishments in the Russian Empire
Cultural heritage monuments in Leningrad Oblast